During the 2013–14 season Valenciennes competed in Ligue 1, the Coupe de France, and the Coupe de la Ligue.

First-team squad

Competitions

Ligue 1

League table

Results summary

Results by round

Matches

Coupe de France

Coupe de la Ligue

References

Valenciennes FC seasons
Valenciennes